The 36th Golden Bell Awards (Mandarin:第36屆金鐘獎) was held on September 28, 2001 at the Sun Yat-sen Memorial Hall, Taipei, Taiwan. The ceremony was broadcast live by TTV.

Winners and nominees
Below is the list of winners and nominees for the main categories.

References

2001
2001 television awards
2001 in Taiwan